Vacuum deposition is a group of processes used to deposit layers of material atom-by-atom or molecule-by-molecule on a solid surface. These processes operate at pressures well below atmospheric pressure (i.e., vacuum). The deposited layers can range from a thickness of one atom up to millimeters, forming freestanding structures. Multiple layers of different materials can be used, for example to form optical coatings. The process can be qualified based on the vapor source; physical vapor deposition uses a liquid or solid source and chemical vapor deposition uses a chemical vapor.

Description 
The vacuum environment may serve one or more purposes:
 reducing the particle density so that the mean free path for collision is long
 reducing the particle density of undesirable atoms and molecules (contaminants)
 providing a low pressure plasma environment
 providing a means for controlling gas and vapor composition
 providing a means for mass flow control into the processing chamber.

Condensing particles can be generated in various ways:
 thermal evaporation
 sputtering
 cathodic arc vaporization
 laser ablation
 decomposition of a chemical vapor precursor, chemical vapor deposition

In reactive deposition, the depositing material reacts either with a component of the gaseous environment (Ti + N → TiN) or with a co-depositing species (Ti + C → TiC). A plasma environment aids in activating gaseous species (N2 → 2N) and in decomposition of chemical vapor precursors (SiH4 → Si + 4H). The plasma may also be used to provide ions for vaporization by sputtering or for bombardment of the substrate for sputter cleaning and for bombardment of the depositing material to densify the structure and tailor properties (ion plating).

Types 
When the vapor source is a liquid or solid the process is called physical vapor deposition (PVD). When the source is a chemical vapor precursor, the process is called chemical vapor deposition (CVD). The latter has several variants: low-pressure chemical vapor deposition (LPCVD), plasma-enhanced chemical vapor deposition (PECVD), and plasma-assisted CVD (PACVD). Often a combination of PVD and CVD processes are used in the same or connected processing chambers.

Applications 
 Electrical conduction: metallic films, resistors, transparent conductive oxides (TCOs), superconducting films & coatings
 Semiconductor devices: semiconductor films, electrically insulating films
 Solar cells
 Optical films: anti-reflective coatings, optical filters
 Reflective coatings: mirrors, hot mirrors
 Tribological coating: hard coatings, erosion resistant coatings, solid film lubricants
 Energy conservation & generation: low emissivity glass coatings, solar absorbing coatings, mirrors, solar thin film photovoltaic cells, smart films
 Magnetic films: magnetic recording
 Diffusion barrier: gas permeation barriers, vapor permeation barriers, solid state diffusion barriers
 Corrosion protection:
 Automotive applications:  lamp reflectors and trim applications
 Vinyl record pressing, manufacture of gold and platinum records

A thickness of less than one micrometre is generally called a thin film, while a thickness greater than one micrometre is called a coating.

See also 
 Ion plating
 Sputter deposition
 Cathodic arc deposition
 Spin coating
 Metallised film
 Molecular vapor deposition

References

Bibliography 

 SVC, "51st Annual Technical Conference Proceedings" (2008) SVC Publications  (previous proceeding available on CD)
 Anders, Andre (editor) "Handbook of Plasma Immersion Ion Implantation and Deposition" (2000) Wiley-Interscience 
 Bach, Hans and Dieter Krause (editors) "Thin Films on Glass" (2003) Springer-Verlag 
 Bunshah, Roitan F (editor). "Handbook of Deposition Technologies for Films and Coatings", second edition (1994)
 Glaser, Hans Joachim "Large Area Glass Coating" (2000) Von Ardenne Anlagentechnik GmbH 
 Glocker and I. Shah (editors), "Handbook of Thin Film Process Technology", Vol.1&2 (2002) Institute of Physics  (2 vol. set)
 Mahan, John E. "Physical Vapor Deposition of Thin Films" (2000) John Wiley & Sons 
 Mattox, Donald M. "Handbook of Physical Vapor Deposition (PVD) Processing" 2nd edition (2010) Elsevier 
 Mattox, Donald M. "The Foundations of Vacuum Coating Technology" (2003) Noyes Publications 
 Mattox, Donald M. and Vivivenne Harwood Mattox (editors) "50 Years of Vacuum Coating Technology and the Growth of the Society of Vacuum Coaters" (2007), Society of Vacuum Coaters 
 Westwood, William D. "Sputter Deposition", AVS Education Committee Book Series, Vol. 2 (2003) AVS 
 Willey, Ronald R. "Practical Monitoring and Control of Optical Thin Films (2007)" Willey Optical, Consultants 
 Willey, Ronald R. "Practical Equipment, Materials, and Processes for Optical Thin Films" (2007) Willey Optical, Consultants 

Thin film deposition
Vacuum
Industrial processes